Mandani Parbat is a mountain of the Garhwal Himalaya in Uttarakhand India.The elevation of Mandani Parbat is  and its prominence is . It is joint 140th highest located entirely within the Uttrakhand. Nanda Devi, is the highest mountain in this category. It lies between Chaukhamba IV,  and Sumeru Parbat, . Its nearest higher neighbor Chaukhamba IV lies 5.5 km east. It is located 8.4 km SE of Sumeru Parbat and 6.5 km NE lies Janhukut .

Climbing history 
In 1938, a German Expedition to the Gangotri Glacier had many first ascents of nearby peaks. On 20 September 1938, in a ten-hour climb from base camp, two climbers, Toni Meszner and Leo Spannraft, became the first to reach the summit of Mandani Parbat.  

In 1973 a small team from  Pune led by Dr G. R. Patwardhan climbed Mandani Parbat on 10 June 1973.
 
On 18 September 1994 a team from Bengal was stopped just 100m below the summit due to a huge crevasse.

Glaciers and rivers 

Gangotri Glacier lies on the northern side of Mandani Parbat from the snout of Gangotri Glacier comes out Bhagirathi River one of the main tributaries of river Ganga. On the south western side lies Mandani Glacier, from there comes out Mandani river after a short run it merges with Kali Ganga at Jalmalla near Kalimath which later joins Mandakini River below Naryankoti near Gupt Kashi later it joins Alaknanda River at Rudra Prayag  which ultimately joins Bhagirathi River the other main tributaries of river Ganga at Dev Prayag and became Ganga there after.

Neighboring peaks
neighboring peaks of Mandani Parbat: 
 Satopanth, 
 Swachhand Peak, 
 Chaukhamba I, 
 Vasuki Parbat, 
 Bhagirathi Parbat III, 
 Kedarnath Peak, 
 Kedarnath Dome, 
 Sumeru Parbat,

See also
 List of Himalayan peaks of Uttarakhand

References

Mountains of Uttarakhand
Six-thousanders of the Himalayas
Geography of Chamoli district